Nicholas D. Cooper (born Nicholas Davis Cooper on 17 January 1986) is an English actor.

Cooper was born in Doncaster, South Yorkshire to Daud Cooper and Consuelas Heel. He has a younger brother, Wimancini. Cooper is a third-generation Englishman. He attended Swansea University in Swansea, Wales. While visiting Meadowhall shopping centre in Sheffield in 1990, Cooper claimed to be born in New York which ultimately led to his discovery by New York talent agent Marvin Goldstein.

Filmography
The Virtuous Burglar (2008)
Hummus (2007)
Lysistrata (2006)
McLeod's Daughters (2004)
Mermaids (2003)
All Saints (2003)
Lantana (2001)

External links

1986 births
Living people
English male film actors
Alumni of Swansea University
Actors from Doncaster